Newsfront is a 1978 Australian drama film starring Bill Hunter, Wendy Hughes, Chris Haywood and Bryan Brown, directed by Phillip Noyce. The screenplay is written by David Elfick, Bob Ellis, Philippe Mora, and Phillip Noyce. The original music score is composed by William Motzing. This film was shot on location in Sydney, New South Wales, Australia.  Incorporating much actual newsreel footage, the film is shot in both black and white and colour.

Plot summary
The plot of the movie is about newsreel cameramen and production staff who will do anything to get footage. Set between the years 1948 and 1956, when television was introduced to Australia, the film tracks the destinies of two brothers, their adventures and misadventures placed in the context of sweeping social and political changes in their native Australia as well as natural disasters. Len Maguire is constitutionally resistant to change, while his younger brother Frank Maguire welcomes any alterations in his own life and in the world around him.

Events covered in the film include Robert Menzies' return as Prime Minister of Australia, the 1951 referendum to ban the Communist Party, Post-war immigration to Australia, the combatting of the rabbit plague, the Redex Reliability Trial, the 1955 Hunter Valley floods and the 1956 introduction of television in Australia.

Main cast

 Bill Hunter as Len Maguire
 Wendy Hughes as Amy Mackenzie
 Gerard Kennedy as Frank Maguire
 Chris Haywood as Chris Hewitt
 John Ewart as Charlie
 John Clayton as Cliff
 Angela Punch McGregor as Fay
 Don Crosby as A.G. Marwood
 Bryan Brown as Geoff
 Mark Holden as Len's new assistant
 Drew Forsythe as Bruce
 Ray Meagher as Len's second brother
 Bruce Spence as Redex trial driver
 Brian Blain as Fred
 Jude Kuring as Geoff's wife
 John Flaus as Father Coughlan
 Tony Barry as Greasy
 Gerry Duggan as Len's father

Production
Phil Noyce showed a copy of his short film Castor and Pollux to David Elfick, a magazine publisher who had made a number of successful surf movies. Elfick, along with Mike Molloy and Philippe Mora had been discussing making a film about newsreel cameramen of the 1940s and 1950s who worked for such companies as Movietone and Cinesound Productions.

Elfick hired Bob Ellis to write the screenplay because he had admired The Legend of King O'Malley. Ellis says he wrote the first draft with Howard Rubie, who had been a cameraman for Cinesound and thought he was going to direct it. Anne Brooksbank later contributed to the script. Noyce was then hired as director and worked with Ellis. Ellis fell out with Noyce and demanded his name be taken off the credits. Ellis:
There was some nonsense about how long it was; we'd set it out, one short scene per page and it finally came out about 300 pages or so but, in fact, it was maybe two and a quarter hours long, which wasn't too bad then or now for something that covered 10 years. But a legend started about how huge it was. When I saw it, I was appalled. I could only see what was missing and abruptly took my name off it. Then when it won all the prizes, I sort of shamefacedly put my name back on it. It was a quite painful experience and I think a very good film, but not as good a film as might have been made. One of the models for it was the film, Yanks, which was a moment in history in particular culture perfectly captured. It had a lot more than the politics in it but, partly because of the budget and partly because of the length, it was pruned back to the politics. Now, the politics was all there in the original but it was surrounding other things, such as the way people spent their Christmases. That was removed.
Funding was provided by the Australian Film Commission and the New South Wales Film Corporation.

Release
The film was shown at Cannes in 1978 and proved popular. The New South Wales Film Corporation insisted seven minutes of the movie be cut out for overseas release.

Newsfront was ultimately released on DVD in 2016. 
The DVD release of Newsfront brings one of Australia's historically lauded films to a worldwide audience. The film's production history is explored in a DVD commentary featuring members of the film's cast and crew. DVD extras include "The Last Newsreel", Australian Newsreel No. 2032 directed by Karen Borger in 1990. 
Other extensive DVD-ROM study materials include an in-depth production history, an archive of reviews, and a detailed account of Newsfront's DVD restoration.

Box office
Newsfront grossed $1,576,000 at the box office in Australia, which is equivalent to $6,713,760 in 2009 dollars. David Elfick estimated the film recovered its costs two years after opening in Australia.

Awards and nominations

Won
AFI Awards 1978:
Best Achievement in Costume Design
Best Achievement in Editing
Best Achievement in Production Design
Best Actor in Lead Role: Bill Hunter
Best Actress in Supporting Role: Angela Punch McGregor
Best Director
Best Film
Best Screenplay
Belgian Film Critics Association Awards 1978: Grand Prix

Nominated
AFI Awards 1978:
Best Achievement in Cinematography
Best Achievement in Sound
Best Actor in Supporting Role: Don Crosby
Best Actor in Supporting Role: Chris Haywood
Best Actress in Lead Role: Wendy Hughes
Best Original Music Score

See also
 Cinema of Australia
 List of Australian films

References

External links
 
 

Newsfront at Oz Movies
Newsfront at the National Film and Sound Archive

1978 films
Australian drama films
Drama films based on actual events
Australian independent films
1978 drama films
Films directed by Phillip Noyce
Films about journalists
1978 independent films
1970s English-language films
English-language drama films